{
  "type": "FeatureCollection",
  "features": [
    {
      "type": "Feature",
      "properties": {},
      "geometry": {
        "type": "Point",
        "coordinates": [
          34.5611343352357,
          0.5699063737153023
        ]
      }
    }
  ]
}
Bungoma is the county town of Bungoma County in Kenya. It was established as a trading centre in the early 20th century. It is located in Kenya's fertile Western region and at the foot of Mount Elgon, Kenya's second tallest mountain. The town and the surrounding areas boast of one of Kenya's highest average rainfall, making it one of the nation's most important food baskets.

Naming

Bungoma, was named from eng'oma—the Bukusu word for drums. The town was originally a meeting place for Bukusu elders. The sound of drums would emanate from the area as the meeting venue, leading to its eventual naming as Bungoma.

There is a second version of the story. It says that in the early days, the area was occupied by the Bungomek, a clan of the Sabaot. The Bungomek was later driven out by the Bukusu, but the name Bungoma, in reference to their occupation, remained.

Economy
Farming is the main economic activity in the county.
Bungoma county is sugar county, with one of the country's largest sugar factories, as well as numerous small-holder sugar mills. Maize is also grown for subsistence, alongside pearl millet and sorghum. Dairy farming is widely practised, as well as the raising of poultry. There is a small but important tourist circuit, centering on the biennial circumcision ceremonies that are mostly practiced by Bukusu, Tachoni and Sabaot.

Aside from sugar processing, the town also boasts of a variety  other manufacturing plants such as maize mills, large bakeries, dairy plants and a plastic factory. Other smaller scale manufacturing activities include steel crafting, iron sheet production, garages and auto repairs among others.

The services sector is also quite vibrant. There is a busy retail sector dominated by local brands, several banks, insurance companies and large hotels to support the local tourist circuit.

Overview 

The major economic activity in the area is sugarcane farming. This is because more than 67000 farmers directly depend on Nzoia Sugar Company Ltd. Early businesses were supported by the Kenya-Uganda Railway which passes through the town. The collapse of Webuye paper mills and the struggling of nzoia sugar company has led to an economic nightmare in the county. Malakisi Ginnery that solely depended of cotton farming in Bungoma County and neighboring counties like Busia has struggled ages to start on its feet because of inadequate cotton supplies and few people have embraced cotton farming. Within Malikisi town, British America Tobacco (BAT) also had a well established leaf buying also contributed and supported the inhabitants of part of Bungoma County that initially had embraced Tobacco farming. Most of the people previously employed there have looked for other jobs while some have totally relocated to other counties.

Major tertiary educational institutions include the Sang'alo Institute of Science and Technology, Mabanga Farmer's training center, SACRED Training Institute, Kibabii University and The Friends School kamusinga.

The Governor of Bungoma is Wycliffe Wangamati who was elected in the 2017 election, preceded by Ken Lusaka after the 2013 Elections who is the current speaker of the Senate. Kenneth Makelo Lusaka would later defeat Governor Wycliffe Wangamati in the August 2022 General Elections to reclaim the seat of Governor. Previously the mayor of Bungoma town was Barasa Mbinga of Ford-Kenya, who beat the previous mayor Majimbo Okumu of ODM in the 2009 mayoral election, voted by the Bungoma councilors. The senator of Bungoma is Hon. Moses M. Wetangula.

See also 
 Railway stations in Kenya
The current Bungoma governor is Kenneth Makelo Lusaka after edging out Wycliffe Wangamati in the August 2022 election.

References

External links 

 Some local Bungoma history
 Bungoma County
 
 Stiedu
 Mukhwana

Populated places in Bungoma County
County capitals in Kenya